Anna Volska (born 1 December 1944 in Milanówek, Poland) is an Australian stage and television actress. She arrived in Australia when she was young and has acted from a young age.

Television work
Volska has appeared in many Australian television drama series, mostly in a guest role. Her first role was in 1965, where she had a small role in The Recruiting Officer. In 1973, Volska had a leading role in Behind the Legend (where she played 'Helena Rubenstein'). She then appeared on A Country Practice from 1987 until 1991. In 2009, she had a recurring role in the final season of All Saints (as 'Katerina Ajanovic'). In 2010, Volska appeared on the telemovie Sisters of War playing the role of nun named Sister Cordula.

Filmography 

FILM

TELEVISION

Theatre
Volska has acted extensively in theatre in companies such as Nimrod Theatre Company and the Bell Shakespeare Company displayed great versatility in roles as varied as those from Shakespeare to modern Australia theatre.

Awards
Volska won a Best Single Performance by an Actress award at the 1973 Logie Awards for her role in Behind The Legend.

References

External links

1944 births
Australian television actresses
Living people
Logie Award winners
Polish emigrants to Australia